Zhang Guangbei (born 11 June 1959) is a Chinese actor, best known in television work for portraying Lü Bu in Romance of the Three Kingdoms (1994) and Chu Yunfei in Drawing Sword (2006).

Early life and education
Zhang was born in Beijing, on June 11, 1959, while his ancestral home in Sichuan. He has an elder sister and an elder brother. As a teenager, at the age of 12, he joined the choir of China National Radio. In 1976, the year the Cultural Revolution ended, he conscripted into military service, where he worked at North China Sea Fleet. Zhang returned to Beijing in 1980 and that year he entered Beijing Film Academy and majored in acting. Two years later, he was accepted to the Central Academy of Drama. After graduating in 1986 he was assigned to Beijing Film Studio.

Acting career
Zhang first came to public attention in 1986 when he was a college student, appearing on Xie Jin's Hibiscus Town, a drama film starring Jiang Wen and Liu Xiaoqing. It is based on a novel by the same name written by Gu Hua.

In 1987, Zhang played the role of Prince Gong in Wang Xuexin's film Two Dowagers, for which he received a Best Actor nomination at the 10th Hundred Flowers Awards. In the following year, he earned his second Best Actor nomination for his performance as Cheng Huan in Mutiny.

Zhang appeared in Hu Guang (1988), which earned him a Chinese Academy of Performing Arts Society Award.

In 1992, he portrayed Emperor Meiji in the historical television series Beiyang Fleet. 

In 1993, Zhang starred in Siu Hung Cheung's action film The Assassin, opposite Zhang Fengyi, Rosamund Kwan, Max Mok.

Zhang gained national fame for his starring role as Lü Bu in the 1994 historical television series Romance of the Three Kingdoms, adapted from Luo Guanzhong's classical novel of the same title.   

In 1996, he played the character King Zhuang of Chu on the television Eastern Zhou Dynasty Various Nations.

Zhang appeared as Zhou Xuan's husband Tang Di in the biographical television series Zhou Xuan, based on the real life of Zhou Xuan, who was one of China's Seven Great Singing Stars in the 1940s.

In 2000, he played the title role in The Sun Comes East, co-starring Wang Ying as Mao Zedong.

In 2001, he joined the main cast of Princess Wencheng as Gar Tongtsen Yulsung, a general of the Tibetan Empire who served as Great Minister during the reign of Songtsen Gampo.

Zhang co-starred with Sun Li and Tong Dawei in the 2002 television series Jade Goddess of Mercy as Bian Xiaojun.

In 2004, he co-starred with Huang Lina and Gui Yalei in Emperor Guangwu of Han as Emperor Guangwu of Han.

Zhang's big break came when Chen Jian and Zhang Qian cast him in Drawing Sword (2006), in which he played the Nationalist army official Chu Yunfei, a role which brought him much publicity.

In 2007, he had a lead role in The Benevolent is Invincible, this was his second time working with Li Youbin after Drawing Sword. That same year, he co-starred with Xiong Naijin, Anya and Wang Yan in the thriller film Letter Box as the amorous man Zheng Chuan.

In 2009, Zhang portrayed Han Xin in the historical television series The Han Triumph, directed by Huang Jianzhong.

Zhang starred in a historical television series called King of Silk (2010) with Jia Yiping and Ma Yili. He was cast as the political commissar in the romance film A Tibetan Love Song, opposite Alec Su, Ju Wenpei, Purba Rgyal, Ariel Aisin-Gioro, and Chen Maolin.

In 2011, he was cast in the comedy film The Kidnappers, playing the father of Wu Zhenlin's character. That same year, he had a minor role in the wuxia television series The Legend of Chu Liuxiang, which starred Ken Chang as Chu Liuxiang.

Zhang made a guest appearance in All for Love (2012), a romantic comedy film directed by Jiang Ping and written by Zhu Ping and Xu Yiwen, starring Ariel Aisin-Gioro, Che Yongli, Alec Su, and Ju Wenpei.

In 2013, he was cast in the war film Chinese Look with Song Chunli, Song Chuyan, Shu Yaoxuan, Zhang Qianru, and Erma Yina. 

In 2015, it was reported that Zhang was in talks to appear as Chang Weisi, a major general, in the film adaption of the best-selling book The Three-Body Problem which will be directed by Panpan Zhang.

Personal life
Zhang married actress Chen Wei in October 1989 in Beijing. Their daughter Zhang Sile was born in 1992 and is also an actress.

Filmography

Film

Television

Film and TV Awards

References

External links
 
 Zhang Guangbei on Douban  
 Zhang Guangbei on Mtime  

1959 births
Male actors from Beijing
Living people
Beijing Film Academy alumni
Central Academy of Drama alumni
Chinese male film actors
Chinese male television actors